The Inquilab is an Urdu-language daily newspaper published from Mumbai. It is owned by the Jagran Prakashan Limited, which also publishes Dainik Jagran. In 2017 it claimed a circulation of 127,255. It was founded by Abdul Hamid Ansari in 1938.

References 

Newspapers published in Mumbai